The Sanremo Music Festival 1960 was the tenth annual Sanremo Music Festival, held at the Sanremo Casino in Sanremo, province of Imperia between 28 and 30 January 1960.

The show was presented by Paolo Ferrari and Enza Sampò. Ezio Radaelli served as artistic director.
  
According to the rules of this edition every song was performed in a double performance by a couple of singers or groups. The winners of the Festival were Tony Dallara and Renato Rascel with the song "Romantica".

Participants and results

References 

Sanremo Music Festival by year
1960 in Italian music
1960 in music
1960 music festivals